Nothing But Trouble is a 1918 American short comedy film featuring Harold Lloyd.

Cast
 Harold Lloyd 
 Snub Pollard 
 Bebe Daniels 
 William Blaisdell
 Helen Gilmore
 Lew Harvey
 Wallace Howe
 Bud Jamison
 Belle Mitchell
 Noah Young

See also
 Harold Lloyd filmography

References

External links

1918 films
1918 short films
1918 comedy films
American silent short films
American black-and-white films
Silent American comedy films
American comedy short films
Films directed by Hal Roach
1910s American films